George Thorne may refer to:

 George Thorne (fl. 1636–1662), mayor of Reading
 George Thorne (actor) (1856–1922), English singer and actor
 George Thorne (golfer), British golfer who competed in the 1900 Summer Olympics
 George Thorne (footballer) (born 1993), English footballer
 George Thorne (politician) (1853–1934), British solicitor and politician

See also
George Thorn (disambiguation)